The Kinnel Water is a river in the Scottish council area of Dumfries and Galloway, in the shire of Dumfriesshire.

History
For a few kilometers, the A701 runs largely parallel to the left bank before crossing the river.

Several streams flow into the Kinnel Water on its course; there are no significant inflows other than the Water of Ae that flows into Templand. The Kinnel Water runs through a sparsely populated region, so that it affects few towns, of which Templand is the most populous.

Structures
The Kinnel Bridge spans the river near Templand and is protected as a Category A monument. The three-arch stone bridge was built in 1723 and was expanded around 100 years later. In Templand, the river also passes through the listed farmhouse Ross Mains. Next is upriver with Raehills House, a mansion of the Earl of Annandale and Hartfell near the right bank.

References

Rivers of Dumfries and Galloway
Solway Firth basin